Matwālā was a biweekly Hindi-language literary and political magazine that existed between 1923 -  1930. The magazine was based in Calcutta.

History and profile
Matwālā was established in 1923. The magazine was headquartered in Calcutta. The founder of the literary and political magazine was Seth Mahadev Prasad. The first editor was Suryakant Tripathi. It had a nationalist political view and satirical and comical tone. One of the contributors was Bhagat Singh. Matwālā folded in 1930.

References

1923 establishments in India
1930 disestablishments in India
Biweekly magazines published in India
Defunct literary magazines
Defunct magazines published in India
Defunct political magazines
Hindi-language magazines
Literary magazines published in India
Magazines established in 1923
Magazines disestablished in 1930
Mass media in Kolkata
Political magazines published in India